These are the Mauritania national football team all time results:

1985

1987

1995

2012

2013

2014

2015

2017

2018

2019

References 

Mauritania - List of International Matches